Camino A Idilia is the fourth LP released by the Argentinian Punk rock formerly Hardcore punk band Shaila, released on November 18, 2006.

The album was recorded and mixed between April and September by Javier Suarez at El Altillo Studio.
Drums and bass were recorded in March 2006 in MCE Studio, Buenos Aires - Argentina by Martin Carrizo and Pablo Sicilano.

Drum Doctor: Martin Carrizo

This is the first album mastered in a foreign country, in Blastin Room Studios, Fort Collins, Colorado - USA by Jason Livermore

Track listing
 "Sudamérica II - El Fracaso Regional" – 2:40
 "Los Caminantes" – 2:46
 "Noviembre" – 3:32
 "Paralogismo en 6" – 2:41
 "La Perfección de los Soberbios" – 2:51
 "Sudamérica I - Malinche" – 3:19
 "L'amour et L'déception" – 3:11
 "Valparaíso" – 2:57
 "Incendio Global" – 2:47
 "Idilia" – 3:16
 "Ironía(s)" – 2:20
 "Sudamérica III - La Meta Supranacional" – 2:31
 "Aunque Digan Que No" – 2:46
 "Alter Ego/Hidden Track "Gracias"" – 8:14

All Lyrics by Joaquín Guillén. 
Music on all song by Pablo Coniglio, except "Paralogismo en 6" by Joaquin Guillén.
All songs arranged by Shaila.
Matías Alvarez sings in "La Meta Supranacional".
Acoustic Guitars by Pablo Coniglio in "Alter Ego", "Aunque Digan Que No", "La Perfección De Los Soberbios", "L'amour et l'decéption" and "Incendio Global".

Personnel
Joaquin Guillén - Vocals
Pablo Coniglio - Bass Guitar And Backing Vocals
Yasser - Guitar
Santiago Tortora - Guitar
Guido X - Drums

Singles
Sudamerica II - El Fracaso Regional
Incendio Global

Videos
 
 

2006 albums
Shaila albums